Stephanie Brown may refer to:

 Stephanie Brown (character), a supporting character in DC Comics Batman series that has used the alter egos "Spoiler", "Robin", and "Batgirl".
 Stephanie Brown Trafton (born 1979), U.S. discus thrower, 2008 Olympic champion